Hemilienardia acinonyx is a species of sea snail, a marine gastropod mollusk in the family Raphitomidae.

Description
The length of the shell varies between 5.5 mm and 8 mm.

Distribution
This marine species occurs off Panglao Island, South Bohol, the Philippines

References

External links
 Fedosov A.E., Stahlschmidt P., Puillandre N., Aznar-Cormano L. & Bouchet P. (2017). Not all spotted cats are leopards: evidence for a Hemilienardia ocellata species complex (Gastropoda: Conoidea: Raphitomidae). European Journal of Taxonomy. 268: 1-20

acinonyx
Gastropods described in 2017